Nasrec is a suburb of Johannesburg, South Africa. It is located in Region F of the City of Johannesburg Metropolitan Municipality.

The name "Nasrec" is an abbreviation for "National Recreation Center". Nasrec is the last station on its branch line of the Johannesburg metro railway line and is home to the Johannesburg Soccer City (FNB Stadium) and Johannesburg Expo Centre.

South African lexicon 
Within the South African lexicon the name of the suburb has become synonymous with the Expo Centre. The 54th National Conference of the African National Congress is also referred to by the name of the suburb as the conference was held at the Expo Centre.

See also 
 FNB Stadium
 54th National Conference of the African National Congress

References

External links 
 Nasrec Station upgrade info

Johannesburg Region F